Mark Dalton is a fictional character from the ABC Daytime soap opera, All My Children. He was portrayed by Mark LaMura. He debuted in 1976 and remained a permanent character until 1989 when he left Pine Valley for a job in China. Mark made special guest appearances in 1994, 1995, 2004, and 2005.

Mark Dalton's significant storylines are his failed romance with his half-sister Erica Kane in the 1970s and of substance abuse, including with risks of HIV and AIDS, in the 1980s.

La Mura earned a Daytime Emmy Award nomination in 1988 for Best Supporting Actor.

References

Further reading
Warner, Gary (1998). Love, Honor and Cherish: The Greatest Wedding Moments from All My Children, General Hospital, and One Life to Live. New York: Hyperion Books. pp. 261, 300. .

External links
Mark Dalton at SoapCentral.com

All My Children characters
Fictional musicians
Male characters in television
Television characters introduced in 1976